Pilibhit Tiger Reserve is located in Pilibhit district of Uttar Pradesh and was notified as a tiger reserve in 2014.
It forms part of the Terai Arc Landscape in the upper Gangetic Plain along the India-Nepal border. The habitat is characterized by sal forests, tall grasslands and swamp maintained by periodic flooding from rivers.

Pilibhit is one of the few well-forested districts in Uttar Pradesh. According to an estimate of the year 2018, Pilibhit district has over  forests, constituting roughly 23% of the district’s total area. Forests in Pilibhit have at least 65 tiger and a prey including five species of deer. The tiger reserve got the first International award TX2 for doubling the tiger population in a stipulated time.

History
The protected area used to be a timber yielding reserve forest, until it was declared as the 46th tiger reserve in June 2014.

Geography
The northeastern boundary of the reserve is the River Sharda,  which defines the Indo-Nepal border, while the southwest boundary is marked by the River Sharda and the River Ghaghara.

Flora

The forest vegetation in Pilibhit Tiger Reserve is of the North Indian moist deciduous type, with sal Shorea robusta forests. The Terai forests and grasslands constitute habitat for over 127 animals, 556 bird species and 2,100 flowering plants. The sal woodland is very dense with good natural regeneration, amounting to almost 76% of the reserve area. The forest patches are interspersed with grass meadows with several like Saccharum, Sclerostachya, Imperata, Themeda, Bothriochloa, Vetiveria, Apluda, Dichanthium, Digitaria and Cyperus. The grasslands are subjected to seasonal flooding water.

Fauna
In spring 2010, the rusty-spotted cat was recorded by camera traps for the time in the Indian Terai.

The habitat has rich faunal diversity, having 5 out of 7 deer species found in the country. Besides, there are some critically endangered species such as the Bengal florican and 13 species of mammals, 9 species of birds and 11 species of reptiles/amphibians found in the reserve are endangered and listed in the Schedule I of the Wildlife Protection Act, 1972. The major faunal species are Bengal tiger, leopard, fishing cat, leopard cat, swamp deer, spotted deer, hog deer, barking deer, blackbuck, sambar deer, sloth bear, Short-nosed fruit bat, painted bat, rhesus macaque, common langur, porcupine, small Indian civet, golden jackal, Indian fox, hyena. As many as 450 birds have been observed which includes a large number of residents. The common resident birds include darter, lesser whistling duck, combed duck, grey partridge, black partridge swamp partridge, peafowl, red jungle fowl, cormorants, egrets, herons, three species of hornbill, six species of eagle, Saras crane and several others. Reptiles include lizards, several species of snakes, mugger crocodile and gharial. The river system harbor around 79 species of fishes.

Ecotourism
Though the main focus is the protection and in-situ of wildlife, the reserve management has also encouraged low impact ecotourism. Park management has developed a Chuka Ecotourism site on the bank of Sharda Sagar dam which is located inside the park.

The Dudhwa tigers are distributed in one major and three smaller populations. Major population is constituted by Dudhwa reserve which includes Dudhwa National Park, Kishenpur and Katarniaghat wildlife sanctuaries, Pilibhit forests and north and south Kheri forests. Smaller tiger populations are present in Bijnor forests in west and Suhelwa and Sohagibarwa wildlife sanctuaries in east.

According to a study by Wildlife Institute of India (WII),  the Dudhwa-Pilibhit tiger population has high conservation value since it is the only population having the ecological and behavioral adaptations of the tiger unique to the Terai region.

Corridors

Pilibhit tiger reserve is an important habitat for tiger owing to its connection with several tiger habitats within the State and outside. The important linkages are:
  Surahi range- Terai East Division Uttarkhand
  Lagga-Bagga - Shuklaphanta National Park (Nepal)
  Kishanpur Wildlife Sanctuary – Dudhwa
The corridor linkages are used by the tiger and other wild animals and require monitoring and restoration by fostering a co-occurrence agenda with local people.

References

External links 

 

Tiger reserves in Uttar Pradesh
Pilibhit district
2014 establishments in Uttar Pradesh
Protected areas established in 2014